Almonacid de la Cuba is a municipality located in the province of Zaragoza, Aragon, Spain. According to the 2012 census (INE), the municipality has a population of 252.

The caves and holes have been preserved and are open to visitors.

See also 
Almonacid de la Cuba Dam
Lobo Hill
List of municipalities in Zaragoza

References

Municipalities in the Province of Zaragoza